Sres. Papis may refer to:
 Sres. Papis (Argentine TV series), 2014
 Sres. Papis (Chilean TV series), 2016-2017